Evelyn "Ed" Bulling (1889–1963) was an English professional footballer who played for Tottenham Hotspur.

Football career 
Bulling, a right back, began his career at Notts Olympic. He joined Tottenham Hotspur in 1910 where he made two appearances.

References 

1889 births
1963 deaths
Sportspeople from Retford
Footballers from Nottinghamshire
English footballers
English Football League players
Tottenham Hotspur F.C. players
Association football fullbacks